Periodic elections for the Tasmanian Legislative Council were held on 1 May 2010. The two seats up for election were Apsley, held by independent MLC Tania Rattray, and Elwick, held by retiring Labor-turned-independent MLC Terry Martin. These seats were last contested in 2004.

Apsley
Sitting independent MLC Tania Rattray was the sole nominee for the election in Apsley, which she had held since 2004. She was thus declared re-elected unopposed.

Elwick
The Hobart seat had been held by Terry Martin since 2004. Martin was facing court on charges of child sex offences, and was not recontesting the election. A frontrunner emerged in Adriana Taylor, Glenorchy Mayor and Labor Party member, although in common with the prevalence of independents in the Legislative Council, Taylor did not seek party endorsement. There were suggestions that Lisa Singh, defeated Labor MHA and former government minister, or Andrew Wilkie might run, but these came to nothing. The Labor Party did endorse a candidate, Health and Community Services Union official Tim Jacobson. The Tasmanian Greens endorsed Housing Tasmania policy officer Kartika Franks, who ran on the Greens' ticket in Denison at the 2010 state election.

References

2010 elections in Australia
Elections in Tasmania
2010s in Tasmania
May 2010 events in Australia